William Proctor House may refer to:

William Proctor House (Marengo, Indiana)
William Proctor House (Arlington, Massachusetts)